10th meridian may refer to:

10th meridian east, a line of longitude east of the Greenwich Meridian
10th meridian west, a line of longitude west of the Greenwich Meridian